The Volkstheater Rostock is the municipal theatre of the Hanseatic city of Rostock. It has three venues: the Großes Haus, the Theater im Stadthafen and the Kleine Komödie and puts on plays, musical theatre/opera, ballet and orchestral concerts. Norddeutsche Philharmonie Rostock is the orchestra for musical theatre and concerts. There is a children's theatre and a theatre youth club.

History
Prior to World War II, the Stadttheater Rostock was the major municipal theatre in the city of Rostock from its opening in 1895 until its destruction in an air raid in 1942. The Volkstheater Rostock was established in 1951 as a means of restarting a municipal theatre company in the city. To this end the Philharmonie, the concert hall of the Norddeutsche Philharmonie Rostock, was repurposed as the new home of the Volkstheater Rostock. That space, now the Theater im Stadthafen, underwent several renovations to accommodate its new more varied performance needs.

Literature 

 Hansestadt Rostock, Presseamt (Hrsg.): Das musikalische Spielplanverzeichnis des Stadttheaters Rostock von 1786 bis 1944. 2 Bände. Hansestadt Rostock, Rostock 1999.
 Renate Meyer-Braun: Löcher im Eisernen Vorhang. Theateraustausch zwischen Bremen und Rostock während des Kalten Krieges (1956–1961): Ein Stück deutsch-deutscher Nachkriegsgeschichte. trafo, Berlin 2007.
 Michael Pietschmann: „Aus deinem Reiche muß ich fliehn – O Königin, Göttin! Laß mich ziehn!“: Wagners Werke am Stadttheater in Rostock. Tectum, Marburg 2002.
 Redieck & Schade GbR Rostock (Hrsg.): Redieck & Schade präsentieren Theater! Aus der Geschichte der Rostocker Bühnen. Norddeutscher Hochschulschriftenverlag, Rostock 1995.
 Freunde und Förderer Volkstheater Rostock (Hrsg.): Bauten und Projekte für das Theater der Hansestadt Rostock 1895–2005. Volkstheater, Rostock 2005.
 Wilhelm Schacht: Zur Geschichte des Rostocker Theaters (1756–1791). Adler, Rostock 1908.

References

External links 
 
  (in German)

PeoplesTheatre
Culture of Mecklenburg-Western Pomerania
Theatre companies in Germany
Opera houses in Germany